The Australian Women's Twenty20 Cup (WT20) was the premier domestic women's Twenty20 cricket competition in Australia. Beginning in 2007 as a series of exhibition matches, the first official tournament took place during the summer of 2009–10. All seven state and territory representative teams from its 50-over counterpart, the pre-existing Women's National Cricket League, participated in the WT20's formal six-year span. The competition was replaced by the Women's Big Bash League in 2015.

The Victorian Spirit were the most successful team, having managed to claim three titles in a row. The New South Wales Breakers finished on top of the ladder at the conclusion of every regular season, but they lost three consecutive championship deciders against Victoria before eventually winning two titles of their own. The Queensland Fire also won one title.

Tournament structure
After experimenting with an informal five-match exhibition structure for each of its first two editions, Cricket Australia delivered a fully-fledged competition for the 2009–10 season which was made up of a single round-robin before a final between the two highest-ranked teams. For 2010–11 and onward, the structure of the tournament was expanded to twelve rounds and a final (or, in the case of the 2013–14 edition, a finals series featuring the four highest-ranked teams) to determine each season's champion.

The competition was typically scheduled alongside, and interspersed with, the Women's National Cricket League as each team would draw from the same squad for both formats. In what was promoted as an "unprecedented" boost to the visibility of the women's game, the 2014–15 season featured eight fixtures paired as double-headers with the men's Big Bash League. This included the championship decider which was also broadcast live and nationally on free-to-air network Ten.

On 19 February 2015, Cricket Australia announced that the competition would be replaced by the Women's Big Bash League. The decision was made in an attempt to further heighten the profile and professionalism of elite-level women's cricket, thereby ideally helping to grow grassroots participation and viewership of the game among girls and women across the country.

Teams

The Australian Women's Twenty20 Cup featured the same seven teams that competed in the Women's National Cricket League from the corresponding period of 2009 to 2015. In addition to each team's primary ground, matches were also played at a wide variety of alternate and boutique venues.

Tournament results

Season summaries

Final summaries

Team performance 

Source:

Legend
C = Champions; RU = Runners-up; SF = Semi-finalists; 1st = Ladder position after regular season

Statistics

Most runs

Most wickets

References

External links

 
 
Cricket
Australian domestic cricket competitions
Twenty20 cricket leagues
Women's Twenty20 cricket competitions
Defunct cricket leagues
2009 establishments in Australia
2015 disestablishments in Australia
Sports leagues established in 2009
Sports leagues disestablished in 2015
Recurring sporting events established in 2009
Recurring sporting events disestablished in 2015